Pamphobeteus is a genus of tarantulas that was first described by Reginald Innes Pocock in 1901. It includes some of the largest spiders in the world. They are found in South America, including the countries of Peru, Bolivia, Ecuador, Brazil, Colombia and Panama.

Diagnosis 
The males of the Pamphobeteus genus have a spoon shaped or thin embolus in the palpal bulb with elongate retrolateral superior and apical keels. They also possess a tibial apophysis with two branches on the first pair of legs, the metatarsus of which closes between the two branches. Females can be distinguished from most genera (except Xenesthis and Longilyra), by the large fused base of the spermathecae and short receptacles, and differs from those two genera by the presence of only ventral metatarsal scopulae on leg IV, and absence of lyriform stridulatory setae respectively.

Species
 it contains eighteen species, endemic to northwestern South America and Panama: 
Pamphobeteus antinous Pocock, 1903 – Peru, Bolivia
Pamphobeteus augusti (Simon, 1889) – Ecuador
Pamphobeteus crassifemur Bertani, Fukushima & Silva, 2008 – Brazil
Pamphobeteus ferox (Ausserer, 1875) – Colombia
Pamphobeteus fortis (Ausserer, 1875) – Colombia
Pamphobeteus grandis Bertani, Fukushima & Silva, 2008 – Brazil
Pamphobeteus insignis Pocock, 1903 – Colombia
 Pamphobeteus lapola Sherwood, Gabriel, Brescovit & Lucas, 2022 – Colombia
 Pamphobeteus nellieblyae Sherwood, Gabriel, Brescovit & Lucas, 2022 – Ecuador
Pamphobeteus nigricolor (Ausserer, 1875) (type) – Colombia and Brazil
Pamphobeteus ornatus Pocock, 1903 – Panama and Colombia
Pamphobeteus petersi Schmidt, 2002 – Ecuador and Peru
Pamphobeteus sucreorum Gabriel & Sherwood, 2022 - Panama
Pamphobeteus ultramarinus Schmidt, 1995 – Ecuador
Pamphobeteus urvinae Sherwood, Gabriel, Brescovit & Lucas, 2022 – Ecuador
Pamphobeteus verdolaga Cifuentes, Perafán & Estrada-Gomez, 2016 – Colombia
Pamphobeteus vespertinus (Simon, 1889) – Ecuador
Pamphobeteus zaruma Sherwood, Gabriel, Brescovit & Lucas, 2022 – Ecuador

Formerly included:

 Pamphobeteus anomalus Mello-Leitão, 1923 → Proshapalopus amazonicus 
 Pamphobeteus benedeni (Bertkau, 1880) → Lasiodora benedeni 
 Pamphobeteus cephalopheus Piza, 1944 → Vitalius vellutinus
 Pamphobeteus communis Piza, 1939 → Vitalius dubius
Pamphobeteus holophaeus Mello-Leitão, 1923 → Eupalaestrus spinosissimus
Pamphobeteus insularis Mello-Leitão, 1923→ Vitalius wacketi 
Pamphobeteus litoralis Piza, 1976→ Vitalius wacketi
Pamphobeteus masculus Piza, 1939 → Vitalius wacketi
Pamphobeteus melanocephalus Mello-Leitão, 1923 → Vitalius sorocabae
Pamphobeteus mus Piza, 1944 → Vitalius dubius
Pamphobeteus piracicabensis Piza, 1933 → Vitalius dubius
Pamphobeteus platyomma Mello-Leitão, 1923 → Vitalius platyomma (Nomen dubium)
Pamphobeteus rondoniensis Mello-Leitão, 1923 → Vitalius rondoniensis (Nomen dubium)
Pamphobeteus roseus Mello-Leitão, 1923 → Vitalius roseus
Pamphobeteus sorocabae Mello-Leitão, 1923 → Vitalius sorocabae
Pamphobeteus striatus Schmidt & Antonelli, 1996 → Lasiodorides striatus
Pamphobeteus tetracanthus Mello-Leitão, 1923 → Vitalius tetracanthus (Nomen dubium)
Pamphobeteus urbanicolus Soares, 1941 → Vitalius dubius 
Pamphobeteus ypiranguensis Soares, 1941 → Vitalius dubius

See also
 List of Theraphosidae species

References

Theraphosidae genera
Spiders of South America
Taxa named by R. I. Pocock
Theraphosidae